Sydney Tower is the tallest structure in Sydney, Australia, and the second-tallest observation tower in the Southern Hemisphere. It has also been known as Centrepoint Tower,  AMP Tower, and colloquially as Flower Tower, Glower Tower, and Big Poke.

The Sydney Tower is a member of the World Federation of Great Towers.

It is accessible from the Pitt Street Mall, Market Street or Castlereagh Street and sits above the Westfield Sydney (formerly Centrepoint) shopping centre. The tower is open to the public, and is one of the most prominent tourist attractions in the city, being visible from a number of vantage points throughout town and from adjoining suburbs. Auckland's Sky Tower is taller but Sydney Tower's main observation deck is almost  higher than the observation deck on Auckland's Sky Tower.

While the shopping centre at the base of the tower is run by the Scentre Group, the tower itself is occupied by Trippas White Group, which owns and operates Sydney Tower Dining, and Merlin Entertainments, which owns and operates the Sydney Tower Eye observation deck and Oztrek simulated ride attraction.

History
Designed by Australian architect Donald Crone, the first plans for Sydney Tower were unveiled in March 1968. Construction of the office building started in 1970, and tower construction began in 1975. It was developed by AMP, with Concrete Constructions the main contractor.

Public access to the tower began in September 1981. The total cost of construction was A$36
million.

While AMP managed the Centrepoint shopping centre, the tower was officially referred to as the AMP Tower. After the Westfield Group took over ownership of Centrepoint in December 2001, the name was changed to Sydney Tower.

In 2009, the base building was closed and stripped for a major refurbishment. This involved the connection of the shopping centre to other arcades and a complete upgrade of all the sites. The shopping centre was progressively reopened from 2010 and was renamed Westfield Sydney. In June 2011 the AMP banner was removed by helicopter from the tower and replaced by a large illuminated Westfield logo.

In 2011, Merlin Entertainments acquired the rights to operate the observation deck, renaming the attraction the Sydney Tower Eye.

Structure

Sections
Four sections of the tower are open to the public, three being occupied by Sydney Tower Dining. 360 Bar and Dining, which offers revolving views of the Sydney skyline, is located on level one of the Sydney Tower. Sydney Tower Buffet, a contemporary self-select restaurant, is on the tower's second level. Studio, located on level three can cater for cocktail functions for 200 people and 156 sit-down guests.

The observation deck, currently called the Sydney Tower Eye, is located on level four of Sydney Tower. To access this level, visitors can buy a pass from the operating company or at the gate. The pass allows access to other Sydney attractions including Wild Life Sydney and the Sydney Aquarium. It has a fully enclosed viewing platform featuring 360-degree views of the city and surrounding areas. This floor also houses a small gift shop, multilingual touchscreens and a readout that displays data about the wind speed, direction, sway amplitude, and other statistics of the tower. On 23 September 2011, a 4D cinema was opened on the fourth floor of the arcade, playing a film with footage from various locations in Sydney. The theatre is the first of its kind in Australia; in-theatre effects include wind, bubbles, and fire.

The viewing platform extends over the edge of the main structure of the deck. It was opened on 18 October 2005, cost A$3.75 million to construct, took four years to design and two months to build. This platform is only accessible as part of planned and booked tours.

Details
The golden turret near the top of the tower has a maximum capacity of 960 people. Travel to the observation deck is by three high speed double-deck lifts, each with a capacity of 8 to 10 people. The lifts travel at full, half or quarter speed, depending on wind conditions. At full speed the lifts reach the deck in 45 seconds.

Cultural events
Leading up to the Sydney 2000 Olympics, the tower was decorated with sculptures by Australian artist Dominique Sutton (an athlete rising from starting blocks, a gymnast performing a handstand, and a wheelchair basketball player passing the ball) which were positioned above the main body of the tower and in some cases overhung the edges. These sculptures were removed in 2003 and relocated to Sydney Olympic Park at Homebush Bay. The figures were placed atop the tower using an S-64 Aircrane heavy lift helicopter known as "Elvis".

On several occasions, the tower has been used to launch fireworks or it has been illuminated with coloured lights as part of various celebrations in Sydney, such as New Year's Eve or during the Olympics in 2000.

Each year the Sydney Tower Stair Challenge comprises the challenge of running up 1,504 stairs from Pitt Street Mall to the Observation Deck. The event is to raise money for the Cancer Council, and the two winners become eligible to compete in the Empire State Building Run-up. However, the event was cancelled in both 2011 and 2012.

Incidents
On 8 March 2018, the Skywalk was closed for five weeks following the suicide of a 21-year-old woman who removed her safety harness and leapt from the tower while on a tour. The Skywalk reopened on 12 April 2018, after conducting a probe into the incident and the tower having upgraded the safety equipment.

The same year, a man fell from the observation deck and died.

Engineering heritage award 
The tower received an Engineering Heritage Plaque from Engineers Australia as part of its Engineering Heritage Recognition Program.

In popular culture
The tower appeared in the 1990 Disney animated film The Rescuers Down Under and the 2003 Disney/Pixar animated film Finding Nemo.
In the film Mission: Impossible 2, the tower is seen in several shots, usually shown whenever the CBD of Sydney appears.
The tower was featured in the 1995 film Mighty Morphin Power Rangers: The Movie, where it was used as the Angel Grove Observatory. A CGI simulation of the tower was used when it became a weapon for the main villain, Ivan Ooze in the film's climactic battle.
 The tower is destroyed in the films Godzilla: Final Wars and Supernova.
The tower is demolished in the 2017 short film Waltzing Tilda.

Gallery

See also

 List of tallest towers in the world
 Hyperboloid structure
 List of hyperboloid structures

References

Further reading 
 Saiful H. Esa: Sydney Tower at Centrepoint, Sydney, University of New South Wales, 1991.
 A. Wargon, E. Smith, A. Davids: Sydney Tower Design for Comfort and Strength, in:  National Structural Engineering Conference, 1990, .
 Alexander Wargon: Sydney Tower at Centrepoint (Australia), in: IBASE STRUCTURES C-34/85 (Telecommunication Towers), Mai 1985, S. 24–27, ISSN 0377-7286. (here online)
 B. J. Vickery, Alan Garnett Davenport: An Investigation of the Behaviour in Wind of the Proposed Centrepoint Tower in Sydney, Australia, University of Western Ontario. Faculty of Engineering Science 1970.
 John Steven Gero, Wargon, Chapman and Associates: Preliminary Report on the Model Investigation of the Centrepoint Tower for the A.M.P., Department of Architectural Science, University of Sydney, 1969, .

External links

 
 Sydney Tower Eye official website
  – Includes photos taken during construction.
 Sydney Tower gets "re-badged" – blog with historic images and newspaper articles of Sydney Tower
 

Towers completed in 1981
Hyperboloid structures
Merlin Entertainments Group
Towers with revolving restaurants
Skyscrapers in Sydney
Towers in Australia
Restaurants in New South Wales
Tourist attractions in Sydney
1981 establishments in Australia
Skyscraper office buildings in Australia
Office buildings in Sydney
Observation towers in Australia
Market Street, Sydney
Recipients of Engineers Australia engineering heritage markers
Westfield Group